The President of the People's National Assembly of Algeria is the presiding officer of that body. From the creation of the Council of the Nation in 1997, the People's National Assembly is the lower house of the Parliament of Algeria.

List

References
  Official website of the People's National Assembly (in French)

Politics of Algeria
Algeria, People's National Assembly
Presidents of the People's National Assembly of Algeria
Lists of Algerian people